The POCO X3, POCO X3 NFC and POCO X3 Pro are Android-based smartphones developed by Xiaomi, announced on 7 and 22 September 2020. The phone has a FHD+ IPS LCD 120Hz 6.67" display, a 48 MP wide, 8 MP ultra-wide, 2 MP macro, and 2 MP depth camera, a 5160 mAh battery, up to 8GB RAM and a side-mounted fingerprint sensor.

Specifications

Hardware

The POCO X3 NFC runs on Qualcomm Snapdragon 732G (8 nm) processor with Adreno 618 to handle graphics. It is equipped with Liquid Cool Technology 1.0 Plus for heat dissipation.

It has a 6.67" 1080 × 2400 pixels (20:9 aspect ratio) IPS LCD display which supports 120 Hz refresh rate and 240 Hz touch sampling rate. The display is certified by TÜV Rheinland.

It is protected with Corning Gorilla Glass 5, plastic frame and plastic back. The phone supports IP53 splash-proof protection.

It comes with 6 GB LPDDR4X RAM, 64 GB or 128 GB UFS 2.1 storage options which is expandable up to 512 GB with microSD card.

The POCO X3 NFC has quad rear camera set-up with 64-megapixels Sony Exmor IMX682 as the primary sensor, 13-megapixels ultrawide camera with 119° angle of view, 2-megapixel macro camera and 2-megapixels depth sensor. The phone can record 4K video at 30 FPS and 720p slow motion video at 960 FPS. The camera app by default outputs 16-megapixels photos while the PRO-mode in camera can capture in 64-megapixels.

The phone has a typical battery capacity of 5160 mAh (lithium ion) which can be charged over USB-C at up to 33W. A 33W charger is included in the box.

Camera sensors used:
Wide: Sony IMX682_l
Front: Samsung Isocell s5k3t2_l
Ultrawide: Hynix _hi1337_l
Macro: Hynix_hi259_I
Depth: OV_ov02b1b_l

Software

The POCO X3 NFC comes with MIUI 12 for POCO, based on Android 10 with POCO Launcher 2.0. It also supports third-party operating systems such as the Android 11-based LineageOS 18 along with Ubuntu Touch.

Price 
In the European market, Poco X3 Pro was launched at €249 for 6GB RAM/128GB storage variant and €299 for 8GB RAM/256GB storage variant

See also 
 Redmi Note 10 Pro 5G — marketed as the POCO X3 GT on global market.

References

External links 
 POCO X3 NFC
 POCO X3 PRO

Phablets
Xiaomi smartphones
Mobile phones introduced in 2020
Mobile phones with multiple rear cameras
Mobile phones with 4K video recording
Mobile phones with infrared transmitter
Ubuntu Touch devices
Discontinued smartphones